United Nations Multidimensional Integrated Stabilization Mission in the Central African Republic (also called MINUSCA, which is an initialism of its French name Mission multidimensionnelle intégrée des Nations unies pour la stabilisation en Centrafrique) is a UN peacekeeping mission, which started on April 10, 2014, to protect Central African Republic civilians under Chapter VII of the UN Charter. It transformed the 6,000-strong African Union-led peacekeeping force known as MISCA into a UN peacekeeping mission and became operational on September 15, 2014. The UN deployed a transition team to set up MINUSCA and prepare for a seamless transition of authority from MISCA to MINUSCA. As of 30 September 2021, it has more than 15,000 troops, police and civilian personnel on the ground. Its role is to:
 support for the transition process;
 facilitating humanitarian assistance;
 promotion and protection of human rights;
 support for justice and the rule of law; 
 disarmament;
 demobilization; 
 reintegration; 
 repatriation processes.

The current Special Representative of the Secretary-General and head of MINUSCA is Valentine Rugwabiza of Rwanda.

The top 3 countries contributing the most personnel are Rwanda, Bangladesh and Pakistan.

History

The Séléka militia staged a rebellion in 2013 that led to the end of François Bozizé's regime in the Central African Republic. The Séléka's continued heinous crimes in Central African Republic led to worsening conditions in Central African Republic, which then evolved the conflict from government resistance into a religious conflict. Information was later found that the Séléka was a Muslim group committing human rights violations against their predominantly Christian country. A Christian militia then formed, calling themselves the Anti-Balaka, to fight against the Séléka.

The Central African Republic began to weaken as the conflict continued, with an incline in mortality and a decline in life expectancy, which attributed to increasing rates of preventable and treatable diseases. The conflict also resulted in 320,000 people fleeing to neighboring countries, including Chad and Democratic Republic of Congo, and as of 2017, left approximately 600,000 people internally displaced.

In 2017, Vietnam made history by sending peacekeepers to join MINUSCA after the country participated in its first peacekeeping operation in South Sudan.

Present 
In 2015, a battalion from the Armed Forces of the Democratic Republic of the Congo (FARDC), numbering 807 personnel, was deployed to the CAR as part of MINUSCA. The DRC also deployed 118 police. In August 2015, allegations surfaced that three DRC soldiers had raped three young women in the town of Bambari, northeast of the capital Bangui. Allegations of child sexual exploitation and abuse were also made. In January 2016, it was announced that the battalion would be repatriated, as it had failed to meet UN "vetting and preparedness" requirements.

In 2017, Batatere, Damakongo and Hibou-2 operations were launched in Bambari, Bokaranga and Bang, and Bangui, respectively, in order to restore peace or drive out armed groups. Portuguese Commandos received a commendation letter during operation Batatere.

In recent attacks taken place in CAR in April 2018, MINUSCA and government forces initiated an operation that would disarm a militia, that was predominantly Muslim, in Bangui's peacekeeping 5 district, which is also where Christians were majority. MINUSCA is challenged to attain the mandate in protecting human rights and disarming and dismantling non state actors due to the lack of infrastructure resistance in using military force.

On April, 2019, Bangladesh Special Forces launched Operation Poupou, in order to recover government pickup trucks and restore freedom of movement in Zoukumbo.

As the mandate for MINUSCA has been extended and amended on November 15, 2019, to fit the needs to support the Central African Armed Forces (FACA), there will be difficulty considering the lack of infrastructure and resources. The update to the mandate also includes for MINUSCA to assist the electoral process for a peaceful transition for president and legislative body by providing good offices, security, operational, logistical, and technical support for the election.

In the Peacekeeping Budget, MINUSCA receives 14% of the budget, with a total of $930,211,900 as of 2018–2019.

On March 12, 2021, the United Nations Security Council voted to increase the size of the MINUSCA force, devoting an additional 2,750 troops and 940 police officers to the Mission.

In September 2021, the UN decided to withdraw some 450 Gabonese peacekeepers from its peacekeeping force in the Central African Republic after accusations of sexual exploitation and abuse which the Gabonese government has opened an investigation into.

Forces Composition

References

2014 in international relations
United Nations operations in Africa
Central African Republic and the United Nations
Military operations involving Portugal